Violette is a 2013 French-Belgian biographical drama film written and directed by Martin Provost, about the French novelist Violette Leduc. It was screened in the Special Presentation section at the 2013 Toronto International Film Festival.

Plot
During the last years of World War II, Violette Leduc lives with Maurice Sachs, who doesn't love her but who does encourage her to write. She seeks out Simone de Beauvoir and eventually presents her with a draft of her first book. De Beauvoir rewards Violette's trust by reading and commenting on the book and by introducing her to contemporary intellectual icons Jean-Paul Sartre, Jean Genet and Albert Camus. In 1964, the success of Violette Leduc's autobiographical bestseller La Bâtarde enables her to earn a living from her writing.

Cast
Emmanuelle Devos as Violette Leduc
Sandrine Kiberlain as Simone de Beauvoir
Jacques Bonnaffé as Jean Genet
Olivier Gourmet as Jacques Guérin
Catherine Hiegel as Berthe Leduc
Stanley Weber as Le jeune maçon

Reception
Violette received generally positive reviews from critics. Review aggregation website Rotten Tomatoes reported an approval rating of 86%, based on 50 reviews, with an average score of 7.2/10. The site's consensus reads, "Led by an outstanding performance from Emmanuelle Devos, Violette is a rewarding, bracingly honest look at social mores and the literary life." At Metacritic, which assigns a normalized rating out of 100 to reviews from mainstream critics, the film received an average score of 72, based on 14 reviews, indicating "generally favorable reviews". Peter Bradshaw of The Guardian gave Violette 4 out of 5 and said that "Emmanuelle Devos brings enormous charisma to this story of writerly ambition and romantic disappointment".

Accolades

References

External links

Press kit (en)

2013 drama films
2013 biographical drama films
2013 films
2010s historical drama films
French biographical drama films
2010s French-language films
Belgian biographical drama films
French historical drama films
Belgian historical drama films
Films set in Paris
Films shot in Paris
Biographical films about writers
Films directed by Martin Provost
Cultural depictions of Simone de Beauvoir
Cultural depictions of French women
Cultural depictions of writers
French World War II films
French-language Belgian films
Belgian World War II films
2010s French films